Xhanfize Frashëri (1912-1971) was an Albanian physician. 

She became the first female physician in Albania in 1937.

References

1912 births
1971 deaths
Albanian physicians
Date of birth missing
Date of death missing